Sheerness is a town in England, United Kingdom. Sheerness may also refer to:

Canada
Sheerness, Alberta, an unincorporated community in Alberta
Sheerness Generating Station, coal fired power plant in Alberta

United Kingdom
Sheerness Dockyard, a naval dockyard in Sheerness, England
Sheerness East railway station, a railway station in Sheerness, England, operated from 1901 to 1950
Sheerness Line, a railway line in England
Sheerness-on-Sea railway station, a railway station in Sheerness, England, since 1883

Other
HMS Sheerness, various ships in the 17th, 18th, and 19th centuries